Ethmia falkovitshi is a moth in the family Depressariidae. It is found in Kazakhstan and Uzbekistan.

References

Moths described in 2010
falkovitshi